John Chaunce (fl. 1406–1409) of Reigate, Surrey, was an English Member of Parliament for Reigate in 1406, 1407, 1417 and 1419.

References

14th-century births
15th-century deaths
15th-century English people
English MPs 1406
English MPs 1407
English MPs 1417
English MPs 1419
People from Reigate